Salim Medical Centre Derai is one of the main welfare medical centres run by qualified doctors and nursing staff for the welfare of the people of Derai . Salim Medical Centre Derai was established on 27 September 1995.

Address
Salim Medical Centre, Derai, near Saidu Sharif Airport postcode 19200, Swat Khyber Pakhtunkhwa, Pakistan.

See also 
 Saidu Teaching Hospital
 Kuzcham Dherai

References

External links
 Salim Medical Centre Dherai, Facebook Page

Healthcare in Pakistan
1995 establishments in Pakistan